K. Kamalakannan (born 11 August 1912 - 24 March 1981) was an Indian businessman, engineering contractor, agriculturist and landowner who served as mayor of Madras from November 1958 to April 1959. He was a member of the Indian National Congress.

He was born in a Tuluva vellala Mudaliar family and a native of Arungal village in Guduvancheri and was educated at Pachaiyappa's College School, Madras.

He was married to the late K.Nethrambigai, and is survived by his two children, K. Vivekanandan and D. Shanthi, and several grandchildren. He belonged to the Tamil Mudaliar community.

Philanthropic efforts

Raised and donated funds for various civic and social causes. Was responsible for the collection of one lakh and five thousand rupees for the fund of Midday Meals Scheme of the Madras Corporation. Donated two buildings for elementary schools, one at T.Nagar, Madras and another at his native place, Arungal village.

Civic Activity

Mayor of Madras; Member of Legislative Council (M.L.C.); Member, Madras District Congress Committee; Treasurer, Madras District Congress Committee; President, Mandal Congress Committee, Royapettah; Member Tamil Nadu Congress Committee; Member, City Council, 1952; chairman, Standing Committee (Works) for two terms; Member, Pachaiyappa's Trust Board; Vice Chairman, Bharat Sevak Samaj; Trust-Board, Yoga Samaj, Adyar; President, Narikoravar Sangham, Tamil Nadu

Director, Mylapore Hindu Permanent Fund, Limited; Managing Trustee, Sundareswarar Devasthanam Royapettah; Trustee, Sri Vadapalani Andavar Temple, Kodambakkam, Madras; Director, Hindu Union Committee High school, Choolai, Madras;

As Vice President of the farmers forum, he led a delegation to various farms in European countries.

Notes 

1912 births
Year of death missing
Mayors of Chennai
Indian National Congress politicians from Tamil Nadu